Regency Square Mall is an enclosed shopping mall in the Arlington area of Jacksonville, Florida, United States. Opened in 1967 and once one of the most successful malls in the country, the mall now features around 20 stores, including one anchor store, Dillard's Clearance Center, Impact Church, and a food court. It is owned by Namdar Realty Group and Mason Asset Management.

History
Regency Square Mall was a $12 million project of Regency Centers, constructed at an expanse of sand dunes. It initially featured three anchor stores: national chain JCPenney, along with May-Cohens and Furchgotts. The mall also included a Woolworth dime store as a junior anchor, as well as a cafeteria-style Piccadilly restaurant. In out parcels, the single-screen (later twinned) Regency Cinema opened on the northeast corner of the property, and Annie Tiques bar and restaurant opened on the southwest corner.

1970s
According to an Urban Land Institute study published by the Florida Times-Union in 1979, it was one of the most profitable retail centers in the nation, with yearly average sales of $156/ft² versus a national average of $88/ft². To give back to the community, the mall operators turned over thousands of dollars in coins from their decorative fountains to charities. All types of social events, from art, shows to science fairs to horticultural exhibits were held there.

1980s
In 1981, a $30 million major expansion nearly doubled the size of the mall, adding Sears and a relocated Ivey's. The former Ivey's became Furchgott's, and the existing May-Cohens was also enlarged. As a result of this expansion, the mall comprised two separate segments: the original mall between JCPenney and May-Cohens, and the new segment between May-Cohens and Sears. Furchgott's was closed in 1985 when the chain merged with Stein Mart. Unlike the other Furchgott's stores, the one at Regency Square did not become a Stein Mart, as the mall management considered the chain too low-end for the mall. A food court and a six-screen AMC theater was added midway along the east wing. The southwest outparcel was removed to make room for the expansion, requiring Annie Tiques to open a new location years later at the Jacksonville Landing when it opened in 1987. May Cohen’s briefly operated as May Florida before being converted to Baton Rouge-based Maison Blanche in July 1988.

1990s

In 1990, the Regency Twin theater on the northeast corner of the property closed, and Picadilly's Cafeteria moved from inside the mall to the new structure they built in its place.

In 1991, Regency Group sold the property to General Growth Properties of Chicago for $71.8 million.

 In early 1992, Maison Blanche was sold to Mobile-based Gayfer's via Mercantile Stores.

This was likewise done at The Avenues Mall a year before. The mall's Woolworth closed in July 1997. Ivey's former store became Montgomery Ward.

While Dillard’s purchased Gayfer's parent company in late 1998, both stores overlapped in this market, so this store instead became Belk. As a result, they opened in Jacksonville for the first time, and the store was in the process of a second expansion when the nameplate was converted. The mall also underwent a $30 million renovation in 1998, which comprised the addition of a new, 24-screen AMC movie complex on the northwest corner of the property to replace the existing six-screen theater inside the mall. A substation of the Jacksonville Sheriff's office was also added, as was a food court. Old Navy also came to the mall in the late 1990s.

Regency announced formal conduct and dress codes in 1999 to deal with offensive or intimidating behavior and gang activity. Because the mall is private property, management has the right to ask individuals not in compliance to leave the premises.

2000s
Montgomery Ward closed in 2001, and Burdines expressed interest in moving into the vacated building. Starting in 2003, General Growth began talking with other retailers, such as Kohl's (which did not operate any stores in Florida at the time) to fill the space vacated by Montgomery Ward. In 2006, HomeWorks Furniture opened occupying the ground floor of the he former Montgomery Ward space, but HomeWorks would close in December 2009 cititing low sales.

Since 2000, crime has become a major issue at Regency Square, and the perception of the area as crime-ridden hurt the mall.  Over 1,000 incidents were reported in 2004, the highest ever. Between September 2007 and September 2008, 650 unlawful acts were documented by the Jacksonville Sheriff's Office, more than the combined total of crimes at Jacksonville's other two major retail centers, The Avenues Mall and St. Johns Town Center. On January 26, 2008, a suspect was killed by an off-duty policeman who was called to pursue a fleeing man who had stolen a pair of jeans from the mall's Belk store. The shoplifter shot the officer four times before being fatally wounded himself.

2010s
In September 2014, Belk announced that their Regency store would close upon the completion of a new store off-mall and closed their doors for good on February 17, 2015.

On April 21, 2016,  Sears announced that its store would also be closing as part of a plan to close 78 stores nationwide. The store would close for good on July 17, 2016. The back-to-back closures of Sears and Belk left Dillard's Clearance Center and JCPenney as the only anchors at Regency Square.

In 2017, International Decor Outlet sued mall owners Namdar and Mason citing an instance where mall ownership ignored tenant complaints about a leaking roof and chose to paint over the water stains to hide them from view, which allowed for the growth of mold.  Other lawsuits from tenants alleged that the mall's air conditioning is often broken and that roaches are allowed to freely roam the property. 

On June 4, 2020, JCPenney announced that they would be closing in October 2020 as part of a plan to close 154 stores nationwide. The departure of JCPenney on October 18, 2020 left Dillard's Clearance Center as the mall's sole anchor. 

In November of 2022 Regency Square Mall was given a warning citation from the City of Jacksonville’s Municipal Code Compliance Division. The citation was given to the property owner, citing various commercial violations in the common areas, including a roof leak, interior ceiling damage, exposed wiring and flooring.

Some of the last remaining tenants at the mall include Auntie Anne's, Bath & Body Works, Jimmy Jazz, and LensCrafters.

Future
In the 2010 Arlington vision plan, citizens recognized the Regency Square Mall property as being ripe for redevelopment, with the potential to attract new businesses and consumers. The comprehensive report covered environmental, economic, and quality of life issues in the Greater Arlington region. The group's approach to the mall property was to redevelop the land with transportation and density in mind. The approach would entail mix-used structures, a gridded street pattern, and infill development. Emphasis is put on the vastness of the area and its equitable size to downtown.

Just as customers shifted from stores in the city center to Regency when it opened in 1967, the mall lost business with the opening of the Avenues mall in 1990, St. Johns Town Center in 2005, and River City Marketplace in 2006. At the end of 2011, Regency's occupancy rate was just over 74%, but two years later, it had dropped below 38%. In August 2013, General Growth Properties put the mall up for sale. It was marketed as a "turn-key" power center redevelopment opportunity.

In February 2014, a press release announced the sale of Regency Square for $13 million to a pair of businesses from Great Neck, New York: Mason Asset Management and Namdar Realty Group.

In the summer of 2016, International Decor Outlet (IDO) was expected to open up to 80 storefronts in Regency Square Mall. This news came after the announcement that locally based Impact Church will take over the former Belk location as well. By mid-2017, IDO had been unable to fulfill expectations and was embroiled in lawsuits. With the departure of an original tenant, JCPenney, in 2020, the mall was considered abandoned. As of 2021, Regency Square Mall is the home of Impact Church and its private school.

Anchors & major retailers
The largest retail space was occupied by Sears with 216,711 sq. ft before the company closed its store in 2016. Three department stores are similarly sized, with former Belk (which closed down its store and became Impact Church) at 188,827 sq. ft., Dillard's Clearance Center in a 182,444 sq. ft. building but only occupying half of that and original anchor JCPenney occupying 176,019 sq. ft. before the store closed. As of 2012, there was one vacant anchor space of 115,000 sq. ft., originally home to 
Montgomery Ward and later, Homeworks Furniture and later a car museum that closed as well. Smaller tenants included Champs Sports/World Foot Locker (37,505 sq. ft.) and Lunar Mini Golf utilizing 24,440 sq. ft.
Dillard’s owns its respective store building and parking lot and Sears also did before it closed down, with the remainder belonging to Namdar Realty Group and Mason Asset Management and the Sears building going to Transformco.

References

External links
Official website

Buildings and structures in Jacksonville, Florida
Shopping malls established in 1967
Shopping malls in Florida
Tourist attractions in Jacksonville, Florida
Arlington, Jacksonville
1967 establishments in Florida
Namdar Realty Group